Calvin is a surname. Notable people with the surname include:

 Henry Calvin (1918–1975), American comic actor
 Hiram Augustus Calvin (1841–1932), Canadian businessman and politician
 John Calvin (1509–1564), theologian, Protestant reformer and proponent of Calvinism
 Idelette Calvin (died 1549), wife of John Calvin
 Katherine Calvin, American earth scientist
 Kathy Calvin (born 1949), chief executive officer of the United Nations Foundation
 Melvin Calvin (1911–1997), American chemist; discoverer of the Calvin Cycle (see below)
 Samuel Calvin (1811–1890), Whig member of the U.S. House of Representatives from Pennsylvania
 Samuel Calvin (geologist) (1840–1911), American geologist
 Tom Calvin (1926-2020), former National Football League halfback
 William H. Calvin (born 1939), American neurophysiologist
 Wyn Calvin (born 1926), Welsh comedian and entertainer